Somers House was a historic home located near Jamesville, Northampton County, Virginia. It was built after 1727, and was a -story, rectangular brick structure covered by a steep gable roof with dormers. It was demolished.

It was listed on the National Register of Historic Places in 1970 and delisted in 2005.

References

External links
Somers House, State Route 183 vicinity, Jamesville, Northampton County, VA 2 photos and 13 measured drawings at Historic American Buildings Survey

Former National Register of Historic Places in Virginia
Historic American Buildings Survey in Virginia
Houses on the National Register of Historic Places in Virginia
Houses completed in 1727
Houses in Northampton County, Virginia
National Register of Historic Places in Northampton County, Virginia
1727 establishments in Virginia